Ghosty is 2023 Indian Tamil-language Comedy horror film written and directed by Kalyaan, and produced by Seed Pictures. It features  Kajal Aggarwal,K.S.Ravikumar,Yogi Babu, Redin Kingsley, Thangadurai, Jagan, Oorvasi, playing the pivotal roles. he film was released 17 March 2023 in theatres.

Cast

Production 
The film first look poster was released  on 14 April 2021.Kajal Aggarwal done a promo shoot of for this film on July 2021.The teaser of the film was released on October 2022  .Later,Trailer released.On that trailer, Film release date also announced as 17 March 2023 .

Reception 
The film was released 17 March 2023 in theatres. Logesh Balachandran from Times of india gave 1.5 stars out of 5 and sated that "Overall, Ghosty is another Tamil film that fails to do justice to the horror-comedy genre,".Chandhini R from Cinema Express gave negative review and gave 1.5 rating out of 5 .India Herald critic wrote that "viewers because of its weak one-liners and ridiculous circumstances." .Dinamalar critic gave negative review about the film and gave 1 star out of 5.

References

External links 

 

Horror comedy films
2020s Tamil-language films